Ontarioville is a small neighborhood within the village of Hanover Park, Illinois.

It lies just south of U.S. Route 20 (Lake Street), at the intersection of County Farm Road and Ontarioville Road. The Hanover Park Metra station is located along the Milwaukee District/West Line tracks that immediately parallel Ontarioville Road.

History 
In the early 1870s, brothers Edwin and Luther Bartlett each established stations named "Bartlett" along the Chicago and Pacific Railroad line.  Luther's station kept the name Bartlett, but to avoid confusion, Edwin renamed his station "Ontario" in 1873, after a legend that the site was built on an old Indian trail between Lake Ontario and Green Bay, Wisconsin.

A post office was established in Ontarioville in 1873.

Ontarioville was eventually incorporated into the surrounding village of Hanover Park in 1982.

References 

Neighborhoods in Illinois
Hanover Park, Illinois
Populated places in Cook County, Illinois
Populated places in DuPage County, Illinois
Former populated places in Illinois
1873 establishments in Illinois